John Paul Ricciardi (born September 26, 1959) is a Major League Baseball executive currently serving as a special advisor to the president of baseball operations with the San Francisco Giants. He previously served as the general manager of the Toronto Blue Jays from 2001 to 2009.

Early life and career
Ricciardi went to and played baseball for St. Peter's/St. Peter-Marian High School in Worcester, Massachusetts, and then played for the Saint Leo University Lions from 1979 through 1980. He then spent two years as an infielder in the New York Mets minor league system, playing for the Mets' A-class league affiliates in Little Falls in 1980 and Shelby in 1981. He finished his playing career with a batting average below .200.

After the conclusion of his playing career, Ricciardi became a coach in the New York Yankees farm system in the early 1980s before joining the Oakland Athletics organization in 1986 as a minor league instructor and scout. By the early 1990s he had risen to the rank of East Coast scouting supervisor and later national crosschecker. Ricciardi made his break into the front office in 1996, when he became special assistant to Athletics general manager Sandy Alderson. Under new general manager Billy Beane, who was hired in 1997 and had been Ricciardi's former teammate with the Little Falls Mets, his role became director of player personnel.

Toronto Blue Jays
Impressed by the success Ricciardi and Beane were having with the low-budget Athletics, the Toronto Blue Jays, who sought to cut payroll while becoming more competitive after their acquisition by Canadian media giant Rogers Communications, sought Ricciardi's services after firing then-general manager Gord Ash. During his tenure, the Blue Jays never made the playoffs, coming closest in 2006, when they finished second in their division.

2001-2004
On November 14, 2001, Ricciardi was hired as general manager of the Blue Jays. He signed a five-year contract with Toronto after the 2002 season, which was extended to 2010 after the 2005 season.

After arriving in Toronto, one of Ricciardi's first deals was to send hard-throwing reliever Billy Koch to the Athletics for third baseman Eric Hinske and pitcher Justin Miller. Over the next few years, Ricciardi would develop a reputation for coziness with his former team, making deals with Oakland for starting pitcher Cory Lidle in November 2002 and another starting pitcher, Ted Lilly, in November 2003. After a surprising 2003 campaign, which saw the emergence of Roy Halladay and Vernon Wells, the team suffered its worst season since 1980, in 2004, mainly due to injuries to key players such as Wells and star slugger Carlos Delgado. Delgado became a free agent in the off-season, and for financial reasons the Blue Jays did not seriously pursue re-signing him; the Florida Marlins eventually inked him to a contract. During the 2004 season, Ricciardi hired former Shelby teammate John Gibbons as the Blue Jays' new manager. Gibbons remained as Blue Jays' manager until being fired on June 20, 2008.

Ricciardi's arrival in Toronto had been greeted with great optimism and enthusiasm after the team had suffered through several disappointing seasons. The enthusiasm steadily waned, however, as the team repeatedly failed to qualify for the postseason.

2005
Ricciardi was given more freedom to move after Blue Jays owner Ted Rogers expanded the team's payroll to $210 million over three years prior to the 2005 season. In the 2005 MLB Draft, Ricciardi famously drafted Ricky Romero instead of Troy Tulowitzki, overruling the recommendations of his scouting staff. While Romero would have modest success, even being named to the 2011 MLB All-Star Game as a Blue Jay before eventually being released by the team, Tulowitzki would have the better career, winning multiple awards with the Colorado Rockies. Coincidentally, Tulowitzki would join the Blue Jays 10 years later in a trade executed by Riccardi's successor, Alex Anthopoulos.

2006
After the 2005 season (in which the Blue Jays posted an 80–82 record), Ricciardi began working to improve Toronto's pitching, signing free agent starter A. J. Burnett and closer B.J. Ryan. He also secured two big bats in first baseman Lyle Overbay and slugging third baseman Troy Glaus via the trade bloc, and signed Gold Glove-winning catcher Bengie Molina as well. The additions paid significant dividends for the team in 2006, as the Blue Jays finished second in the tough American League East with an 87–75 record. It was the first time Toronto had finished above third in the division since winning the 1993 World Series.

2007
Seeking to upgrade the everyday lineup as well, Ricciardi signed a two-year contract with experienced slugger and designated hitter Frank Thomas. However, due to his slow start in 2008, in which he batted just .167 with three home runs in his first 60 at-bats, Thomas was released in April of that year. Ricciardi also signed veteran shortstop Royce Clayton as a "stopgap" measure to shore up the middle infield for the 2007 season.

During spring training of 2007, B.J. Ryan was suffering from an injury that Ricciardi initially reported to be a result of a bad back. It was later revealed that it was not a back injury that he was suffering from at all, but rather a more severe elbow injury which subsequently required season ending Tommy John surgery. When asked why he was not more upfront about Ryan's injury situation, Ricciardi responded by saying, "They're not lies if we know the truth."

2008
Despite the lack of hitting on his 2008 ball club, Ricciardi had assembled one of the more effective pitching staffs in Major League Baseball, bolstered by bullpen pick-ups such as Scott Downs, Brian Tallet, Jesse Carlson, and Shawn Camp. Over the season, the team had the best ERA in baseball at 3.49 and the bullpen ERA of 2.94. Early in the season, the Jays struggled, and the team fired manager John Gibbons, replacing him with former manager Cito Gaston. Toronto ended the season on a high note, finishing with a final record of 86 wins and 76 losses, the organization's third-best showing since the 1993 season.

In the middle of June 2008, with the Jays in last place in the American League East, Ricciardi appeared on local Toronto sports radio station The FAN 590, in which he fielded questions from fans. One fan insisted that the Jays should actively seek to acquire Cincinnati Reds outfielder Adam Dunn, to which Ricciardi responded with very negative personal comments about Dunn's passion for the game of baseball:

On June 24, 2008, Ricciardi told Toronto media that he received a personal phone call from Dunn and personally apologized for the ad-lib comments, a conversation Dunn vehemently refuted in an interview with MLB.com. Some again questioned Ricciardi's trustworthiness, but Ricciardi said, "All I know is the person I talked to said it was Adam Dunn. That's quite a prank to pull."

2009
During Roy Halladay's last home start of the 2009 season on September 25, a sign in the 500 level stating "Fire JP!" was hung over the railing. The sign was taken away by security at the bottom of the 2nd inning.

With two games remaining in what was a disappointing 2009 season, Ricciardi was fired on October 3, 2009. The day before Blue Jays players had gone public with criticism over Gaston's managing style, and had asked for a meeting with team president Paul Beeston. His firing was widely expected. Ricciardi was replaced by assistant vice-president of baseball operations and assistant general manager, Alex Anthopoulos. Anthopoulos was eventually made the permanent general manager for the Jays.

New York Mets
Ricciardi joined the Mets front office in November 2010.

From 2011 to 2018 Ricciardi served as special assistant to former New York Mets General Manager Sandy Alderson. In July 2018 Alderson took a leave of absence from the Mets due to a recurrence of cancer. Ricciardi along with John Ricco and Omar Minaya assumed the responsibilities of general manager. Ricciardi and the Mets mutually parted ways after the 2018 season.

San Francisco Giants
In December 2018, Ricciardi was hired by the San Francisco Giants as a senior adviser of baseball operations.

Television career
On February 25, 2010, ESPN announced that Ricciardi would join Baseball Tonight as an analyst after spending three decades in Major League Baseball.

Ricciardi left ESPN to join the Mets front office in November 2010.

Personal life
Ricciardi is married and lives with his family in West Boylston, Massachusetts. He and his wife Diane have two sons, Dante and Mariano. He also has a brother, Stephan Ricciardi, and sister, Mary Sivo.

Ricciardi's son Dante was drafted by the Seattle Mariners in the 39th round of the 2015 MLB June Amateur Draft from Worcester Academy.

Ricciardi's father, John, was an outstanding athlete at Worcester Boys' Trade High School. Johnny was named three-time, "All City" in baseball and won multiple batting crowns as a varsity third baseman. Johnny won the batting crown in the Worcester Parks Community League and also was one of the youngest athletes to play with the Norton Abrasives, a semi-pro team that competed against several barnstorming major league players. He signed a contract with the Boston Red Sox in 1948. He played professional baseball in Canada with Fredericton, New Brunswick, in the Can-Am League. He also played for the Worcester Hawks, a professional fast-pitch softball team. Johnny was later inducted into both the Worcester Public Schools Hall of Fame and the Sons of Italy of Worcester Hall of Fame.

Ricciardi is also a fan of the Boston Bruins, New England Patriots and Boston Celtics.

Executive career

References

External links
The Ricciardi Project - Evaluation of trades

1959 births
Living people
American expatriate baseball people in Canada
Businesspeople from Worcester, Massachusetts
Little Falls Mets players
Shelby Mets players
Saint Leo Lions baseball players
Minor league baseball coaches
Major League Baseball general managers
Oakland Athletics scouts
Oakland Athletics executives
Toronto Blue Jays executives
New York Mets executives
San Francisco Giants executives